Quintilla was a 3rd-century prophetess.

Quintilla may also refer to:

755 Quintilla, a minor planet
Quintilla (poetry), a Spanish poetic form
Neptis quintilla, an African species of butterfly
Elvira Quintillá (1928–2013), a Spanish actress
Florian Quintilla (born 1988), a French professional rugby league footballer
Jordi Quintillà (born 1993), a Spanish association footballer
Xavi Quintillà (born 1996), a Spanish association footballer